This article is a list of King's and Queen's commissioners of the province of Utrecht, Netherlands.

List of King's and Queen's commissioners of Utrecht since 1945

References

Utrecht